Maryse Narcisse (born 1958) is a Haitian politician. She was a candidate in the 2016–17 presidential election, representing the Fanmi Lavalas party.

Biography 
Maryse Narcisse was born in Pétion-Ville. She is the daughter of Denise Péan Narcisse, a teacher, and Marc Narcissus, a judge. She holds a Masters in Public Health from Tulane University in the United States. She was married twice, the first time when she was 23, and she has one son.

References 

1958 births
21st-century Haitian women politicians
21st-century Haitian politicians
People from Port-au-Prince
Tulane University alumni
Living people